In mathematics, a progressive function ƒ ∈ L2(R) is a function whose Fourier transform is supported by positive frequencies only:

It is called super regressive if and only if the time reversed function f(−t) is progressive, or equivalently, if

The complex conjugate of a progressive function is regressive, and vice versa.

The space of progressive functions is sometimes denoted , which is known as the Hardy space of the upper half-plane.  This is because a progressive function has the Fourier inversion formula

and hence extends to a holomorphic function on the upper half-plane 

by the formula

Conversely, every holomorphic function on the upper half-plane which is uniformly square-integrable on every horizontal line
will arise in this manner.

Regressive functions are similarly associated with the Hardy space on the lower half-plane .

Hardy spaces
Types of functions